Catherine Wilkinson (1786–1860) was an Irish migrant, "wife of a labourer", who became known as the Saint of the Slums. In 1832, during a cholera epidemic, she had the only boiler in her neighbourhood, so she invited those with infected clothes or linens to use it, thus saving many lives.  This was the first public washhouse in Liverpool. Ten years later with public funds her efforts resulted in the opening of a combined washhouse and public baths, the first in the United Kingdom.

Personal life
Wilkinson was born Catherine Seaward in County Londonderry, Ireland, and at the age of nine was coming to Liverpool with her parents, when their ship ran aground in the Mersey and her father and younger sister drowned.  At twelve years of age she went to work at a cotton mill in Caton, Lancashire, where she was an indentured apprentice. At age 20 she left the mill and returned to live with her mother in Liverpool, where they both were in domestic service. In 1812 she married a sailor, Emanuel Demontee, although her mother continued to live with her. After two children in quick succession, with her husband drowned at sea, she returned to domestic service.  But shortly thereafter, upon being gifted with a mangle, she set herself up as a laundress.  In 1823, she married Thomas Wilkinson, a warehouse porter, and they continued to live at the Denison Street house that she rented.

Crusade
In 1832, cholera broke out in Liverpool, part of the 1826–1837 cholera pandemic.  Wilkinson took the initiative to offer the use of her boiler, house and yard to neighbours to wash their clothes, at a charge of 1 penny per week, and she showed them how to use a chloride of lime to get them clean. Boiling killed the cholera bacteria. Once these activities came to their attention, Wilkinson was supported by the District Provident Society and William Rathbone.  Convinced of the importance of cleanliness in combating disease, she pushed for the establishment of public baths where the poor could bathe. In 1842 the combined public baths and washhouse was opened on Upper Fredrick Street in Liverpool, and in 1846 Wilkinson was appointed superintendent of the public baths.

Recognition and legacy
In 1846 the Mayor presented Wilkinson with a silver teapot from Queen Victoria inscribed "The Queen, the Queen Dowager, and the Ladies of Liverpool to Catherine Wilkinson, 1846." Wilkinson died in Liverpool and was buried in the St. James Cemetery. with the inscription: 

In 2012, a marble statue of Kitty Wilkinson was unveiled in St George's Hall.

The non-profit Kitty's Laundrette, named after Wilkinson, opened in Everton in 2018.

In May 2017, students at the University of Liverpool voted to change one of the names of the rooms in the Liverpool Guild's building. After 1,400 votes, it was chosen to rename the room the Kitty Wilkinson room.

Biographies
In 1910 The Life of Kitty Wilkinson was published by Winifred Rathbone which provided a more accurate story of her life than previously available in "Catherine of Liverpool" in Chambers' Miscellany.

A series of articles in 1972, published in Baths Service ‘The Journal of the Institute of Baths Management Incorporated’,argued that Kitty Wilkinson's life had become "a civic myth". John Dobie, a trained historian and a civil servant in the education system, drew on extensive primary material such as town council records to show that the first baths and wash-house opened in 1842, several years before the one which the 
Wilkinsons supervised, and that the legend of "Catherine of Liverpool" was bult up over generations, starting with William Rathbone.

In 2000, a fuller biography, The Life of Kitty Wilkinson, was written by Liverpool author and civic historian Michael Kelly.  Kelly also starred in a short documentary about Wilkinson's life, produced by a group of students at Edge Hill University in 2014, with the title Kitty: The Saint of the Slums.

References

Sources

Further reading

1786 births
Public baths in the United Kingdom
1860 deaths
People from County Londonderry